KEVI may refer to :

 Kevin Ford (producer)
 The King Edward VI School, Morpeth (KEVI Morpeth)